is the ninth single by Japanese music trio Candies. Written by Yūsuke Hoguchi, the single was released on March 1, 1976. The single is a rearranged version of the song originally from the 1975 album Toshishita no Otokonoko. Since its release, "Haru Ichiban" has become the trio's signature song.

The song peaked at No. 3 on Oricon's singles chart and sold over 360,000 copies, becoming their first top-five hit. The trio performed this song on the 27th Kōhaku Uta Gassen.

Track listing

Chart positions

Cover versions 
 Jiang Xiao-Qing covered the song in Chinese for a Suntory oolong tea commercial in 1994.
 Ulfuls covered the song as the B-side of their 1996 single "Banzai ~ Suki de Yokatte ~".
 Yuzu covered the song in their 2001 live album Kajiki ~ Futari no Big (Egg) Joe-hen.
 Ikimono-gakari covered the song as the B-side of their 2007 single "Uruwashiki Hito/Seishun no Tobira".
 Chiaki Takahashi and Asami Imai covered the song in the album The Idolm@ster Radio Uta Dojo.
 Saori Hayami, Iori Nomizu, and Mina covered the song as the ending theme of the 2009 anime series Heaven's Lost Property.
 Wakadanna covered the song in his 2012 single "Ore ga Ore ga ~ Sekaijū ga Teki ni Natte mo ~/Haru Ichiban".

References

External links 
 

1976 singles
1976 songs
Japanese-language songs
Candies (group) songs
Sony Music Entertainment Japan singles